Xu Tingyao, Hsu Ting-Yao, (1892–16 December 1974), courtesy name Yuexiang was a Chinese Nationalist general from Wuwei, Anhui.

General Xu, commanded 17th Army during the Defense of the Great Wall in 1933, taking temporary command of the 8th Army Group when its commander was relieved. In July of the same year his army took control of the Beijing - Suiyuan Railroad to blockade the Chahar People's Anti-Japanese Army.

From 1934 to 1935 he was the head of a Chinese military delegation to Europe and the United States. In October 1935 he took charge of the training schools for China's developing mechanized forces in the next few years.

Xu commanded the 38th Army Group in the campaign in Guangxi from December 1939 to April 1940. His forces including the mechanized troops of the 5th Corps and 200th Division defeated the Japanese in the Battle of Kunlun Pass.

References 
 China's Anti-Japanese War Combat Operations
 Author : Guo Rugui, editor-in-chief Huang Yuzhang
 Press : Jiangsu People's Publishing House
 Date published : 2005-7-1
 
 Also on line:   

National Revolutionary Army generals from Anhui
1892 births
1974 deaths
Politicians from Wuhu
Republic of China politicians from Anhui
Taiwanese people from Anhui